A referendum on extending President Islam Karimov's term was held in Uzbekistan on 26 March 1995. The proposal would see Karimov remain in office until 2000. It was approved by 99.6% of voters, with a 99.3% turnout. The referendum was held a few months before Karimov's current term was due to expire, as he had been elected in December 1991.

Conduct
The United States criticized the referendum for its "lack of public debate", and noted several cases where one person cast votes for their entire family. At the time, Karimov publicly stated that he considered the referendum to be the equivalent of re-election for a second term, which under the Constitution would have required him to leave office in 2000. However, the legislature passed a resolution opposing the decision, leading Karimov to announce he would run for re-election in 2000.

Results

References

Uzbekistan
1995 in Uzbekistan
Referendums in Uzbekistan